The Samual S Fels High School (commonly referred to as Fels High School) is a district-run high school in Philadelphia. The school is named after  Samuel Simeon Fels. It was founded in 1989 when the Samuel S. Fels Junior High School was restructured to have seventh through tenth grades, with the eleventh and twelfth grades to be added in 1990 and 1991. Melvin K. McMaster was the first principal of the high school. An $80 million building replaced the old facility in 2009.

Notes

External links
 Samuel S. Fels High School - school website
 

Fels, Samuel S. High School
School District of Philadelphia
Public high schools in Pennsylvania